Somebody's Darling is a 1925 British silent comedy film directed by George A. Cooper and starring Betty Balfour, Rex O'Malley and Fred Raynham.

The screenplay concerns a young woman who believes herself to be an orphan and rediscovers her family when she is left a large inheritance, only for a sinister uncle to try to cheat her out of money. The film marked an attempt by Balfour to avoid being typecast in her popular role as the Cockney Squibs by playing an upper-class heiress. She defended her move by declaring "I don't have to wear any shabby or sombre dresses for this part. I go out and spend lots of money on beautiful Paquin gowns and frocks and wraps".

Cast
 Betty Balfour - Joan Meredith
 Rex O'Malley - Jack Esmonds
 Fred Raynham - J.W. Jordan
 J. Fisher White - Grandfather
 Minna Grey - Miss Jordan
 Clarence Blakiston - Sir John Esmonds
 A. Bromley Davenport - Sleeper
 Clifton Boyne - Publisher
 Jack Harris - Potman

References

Bibliography
 Macnab, Geoffrey. Searching for Stars: Stardon and Screen Acting in British Cinema. Cassell, 2000.

External links

1925 films
1926 comedy films
1926 films
Films directed by George A. Cooper
British comedy films
British black-and-white films
British silent feature films
1925 comedy films
1920s English-language films
1920s British films
Silent comedy films